Jervell is a surname. Notable people with the surname include:

Anton Jervell (1901–1987), Norwegian physician, politician, and organizational leader
Jacob Jervell (1925–2014), Norwegian theologian, professor emeritus, author, and priest

See also
Jerrell